Nakhlestan Tang-e Khour is a village in Khalili Rural District, in the Central District of Gerash County, Fars Province, Iran. As of the 2016 census, its population was 116, with 32 families.

References 

Populated places in Gerash County